The Kubinka Tank Museum (Центральный музей бронетанкового вооружения и техники - Tsentral'nyy Muzey Bronetankovogo Vooruzheniya I Tekhniki -Central Museum of Armored Arms and Technology) is a large military museum in Kubinka, Odintsovsky District, Moscow Oblast, Russia where tanks, armoured fighting vehicles (AFVs) and their relevant information are displayed and showcased. The museum consists of open-air and indoor permanent exhibitions of many famous tanks and armored vehicles from throughout the 20th and 21st centuries (between 1917 and the present day). It also houses and displays many unique, unusual and one-of-a-kind military vehicles of which there are very few remaining examples, such as the German Panzer VIII Maus super-heavy tank, Troyanov's Object 279 Kotin heavy tank, the Karl-Gerät heavy self-propelled artillery, and the Object 120 Su-152 "Taran" tank destroyer, amongst other single or limited-production prototypes from the Soviet Union and Nazi Germany.

About 
The Kubinka Tank Museum is located on a historically "classified" Red Army armor testing facility. Most of its displays in the museum were derived from the research collection of the still-functioning Kubinka armour testing and proving ground. Most Cold War-era Western tanks (from the USA or Western Europe) were war trophies from the Middle East, Africa, Vietnam and Latin America, which were all sent to the armour testing facility at Kubinka to study and focus on any strengths and weaknesses. Due to its secretive history as well as its close relationship with the military, the museum is still staffed entirely by Russian Army personnel today. As belonging to an official military unit, the staff of the museum wears a special sleeve insignia on their uniform.

Since 2014, the museum has been a part of the Patriot military theme park. As a result, almost all tanks have been moved from that facility to that said park.

Admission and visitor restrictions 
As of 2017, access into museum is available for all visitors. The entrance fee is 300–500 rubles (US$4–US$7), depending on the particular part of the site, which is wide-spread. Guided tours in English are more expensive, starting at 4500 (US$60) rubles for each site. Access for children under the age of six is free. Permission to film and record videos of any vehicles thereof is included in the entrance fee. Foreign citizens are recommended to have a copy of their passport to enter the museum, as well as the original version. As it is still part of a Kubinka military base, weapons and alcohol are strictly prohibited; at the entrances, inspections are carried out by security staff with the help of metal detectors.

Exhibits 

The museum hosts a wide variety of tanks and armored vehicles developed and used throughout the 20th century by the Soviets, Germans and many other nations. Around 60% of the exhibits are Soviet-era vehicles, with the most recent display being the Object 172, the prototype of the T-72 MBT. Apart from that, the only remaining Panzer VIII Maus, a captured British tank Mark V of the First World War (used by the White Russian forces during the Russian Civil War), the surviving Panzer I Ausf. F (which is an upgrade over the Panzer I), along with several different Hungarian, Polish, Japanese, South African, British and American vehicles – are on display as well.

Apart from that, the museum also exhibits an Ilyushin Il-2 plane wreck, anti-tank artillery, a cutaway model of a V-2-34 engine and other miscellaneous items in the museum.

Access 
Located in the outskirts of Moscow, Kubinka is easily accessible by suburban train from Belorussky railway station, Moscow. Until recently, the complex network of local trains and the lack of English language materials made it awkward to take the right train without knowledge of the Russian language. Since 2016, the Kubinka Tank Museum has 2 separate sites, 12 km2 each. Beginning in 2017, visitors can take the shuttle bus – available during official celebrations or special events (e.g. Army Forum or International Army Games, but not Tank Troop Day). Taxis can also be used, following up with microbus services and the assistance of other signage. Without knowledge of the Russian language, this is quite difficult to do. As such, it is recommended to use the services of an English-speaking guide.

World War II history 

Kubinka was a top-secret armour testing range and proving ground from before World War II. All new designs from Russian research and design bureaus, facilities and factories had to be first tested here. Also, Nazi German tanks and armoured fighting vehicles (AFVs) that were either captured by Soviet troops or donated by the Western Allies were also tested in Kubinka.

Before Operation Barbarossa in June 1941, some German tanks and AFVs were sold to the Soviet Union and these were also tested at Kubinka. Some of these tanks included the Panzer I light tank, the Panzer II light tank and the Panzer III medium tank, which were all carefully studied and evaluated by the Soviet Union. After 1941, several captured tanks and AFVs of Nazi Germany (like the Panzer IV medium tank, the Jagdpanzer IV tank destroyer, the Sturmgeschütz III and Sturmgeschütz IV assault guns/tank destroyers and the Elefant heavy tank destroyer, amongst others), including half-tracks, were evaluated here as well. Rare vehicles or prototypes of German armour and combat vehicles that fell into Soviet hands were also taken to Kubinka and tested before being put on display; such vehicles include a large mine-roller vehicle, an 88mm anti-tank self-propelled gun carriage and most notably, the 188-ton Panzer VIII Maus super-heavy tank and the 60 cm Karl-Gerät super-heavy self-propelled howitzer.

A few captured Tiger I heavy tanks were brought to the testing and proving grounds at Kubinka in 1943 to be subjected to firing tests so as to gauge its armour protection level and field or develop weapons that would knock out the tank. From the tests, it was determined that the most effective weapon against the tank's thick armour was the Soviet 85 mm 52-K Model 1939 anti-aircraft gun, which could penetrate the Tiger I's frontal armour (100 mm thick) within the range of 1000 metres. Several Tiger II heavy tanks were also captured by the Soviet Union and were brought to Kubinka for further evaluations in 1944.

In 1945 the Soviet Union also tested captured Japanese tanks that were seized after the rapid Soviet invasion of Manchuria, South Sakhalin, the Kuril Islands, northern China and northern Korea. (These include the Type 95 Ha-Go light tank, the Type 4 Ke-Nu light tank, the Type 2 Ka-Mi amphibious light tank (which has all of its pontoons and flotation devices fitted), and the Type 95 Ri-Ki crane vehicle (a combat engineering vehicle), amongst other types.)

Besides captured Axis tanks and AFVs, the USSR also tested several Western Allied armour and military vehicles supplied to it under the Lend-Lease military assistance program started by the United States. Such vehicles include the US M3 Stuart, M3 Lee/Grant, M4 Sherman, and also British ones, such as the Matilda II, Churchill and Valentine tanks.

Cold War history 

Soviet tank technology was chiefly concentrated at the Kubinka Force Technology Center, which provided a series of technical evaluations and testing and relevant information to the national defense system to facilitate potential or future tank designs. Today, the Kubinka Tank Museum exhibits more than 50 tanks and other armored fighting vehicles procured from abroad during the Cold War.

Some of these vehicles are as follows:
 An M24 Chaffee light tank of the French colonial armies and participated in the First Indochina War between 1946 and 1954. During the Battle of Dien Bien Phu, the Viet Minh captured at least three French M24 Chaffees and sent a few of them to the Soviet Union after the war. However, the USSR was sent at least two Chaffees by the USA prior to the end of WWII as part of the American Lend-Lease program, which were supposedly evaluated at Kubinka and still remain on display there.
 A M41 Walker Bulldog light tank was sent to the Kubinka Force Technology Center during the early 1960s or early 1970s. Most sources state it was one of five captured by Cuba in 1961 during the Bay of Pigs Invasion; however, this M41 may have also been one of several hundred captured by the People's Army of Vietnam (PAVN) during the Vietnam War and sent to the USSR following the fall of South Vietnam in 1975.
 Some M48 Patton medium tanks are also on display there. Some of these were captured by Syrian troops in Lebanon during the 1982 Lebanon War and were later sent to the Soviet Union for evaluation. One of the M48 Patton tanks on display (formerly Israeli) is fitted with "Blazer" ERA (explosive reactive armour), while others were captured by the PAVN during the Vietnam War.
 An M60 Patton main battle tank (MBT) was also captured by Syria from Israel in 1982 and donated to the Soviet Union, which proceeded to analyse the latest types of ammunition and weaponry on the tank. The few other M60 Patton tanks at the museum were captured by Egypt (also from Israel) in the Yom Kippur War of 1973 and by Iraq in the 1980s (which captured theirs from Iran during the Iran–Iraq War) and inspected by Soviet military officers. One IDF (Israel Defence Forces) M60 Patton was captured in 1973 in the Sinai by the Egyptian Army and was flown to the Soviet Union after some negotiations with Egyptian government. One of the first M60 Pattons that fell into the hands of the USSR during the Cold War came from Iran, from where a disgruntled army officer reportedly defected to the USSR in the stolen vehicle.
 Former American M26 Pershing and M46 Patton medium tanks, which were captured by the Chinese People's Volunteer Army (PVA) during the Korean War, are on display as well and were sent for testing and evaluations at the Kubinka Force Technology Centre after the war ended in 1953. One of these tanks can still be seen at the museum.
 Several M113 armoured personnel carriers (APCs) were captured by North Vietnam during the Vietnam War and were also sent to the Kubinka Force Technology Centre for careful studies and evaluations. Other M113 APCs might have been acquired from Somalia (which, before the 1970s, was an ally of the USSR).
 Several British Centurion MBTs are displayed at the museum. A British Army Centurion Mk.III was captured during the Korean War (most likely by Chinese PVA forces) and sent to the USSR. It has been theorised that at least one South African Olifant Mk1A, a variant of the Centurion Mk. V, was also transferred to Kubinka after being captured by Angolan and Cuban troops during Operation Packer in the Angolan Civil War/South African Border War. Israeli Centurions captured by Egypt during the Yom Kippur War were also sent to and evaluated at Kubinka.
 A British Conqueror heavy tank is also on display at the museum. This tank was donated to the Kubinka Tank Museum by the Imperial War Museum (IWM) in the UK to the Soviet Union in exchange for a Soviet IS-2 heavy tank in 1988 (the exchange was allegedly conducted in the then-divided city of Berlin).
 A former Iranian Army Chieftain Mk.5 MBT and an FV101 Scorpion light tank were sent to the Soviet Union by Iraq during the Iran–Iraq War.
 An IDF M51 Super Sherman medium tank was captured by either Egypt or Syria and was sent to the Soviet Union and is on display at the museum.
 A French AMX-13/75 light tank that was received from Algeria after the Algerian War during the 1950s and the 1960s.
Two French Panhard AML armoured reconnaissance vehicles and their South African counterpart, an Eland.
 A Swedish Prototype Stridsvagn 103 (S-Tank) amphibious main battle tank is also on display at the museum, one of over two dozen given away by the Swedish government to museums around the world after the Strv 103 was officially withdrawn from Swedish military service in 1996.

See also 
Tank museums
Musée des Blindés – France
The Tank Museum – United Kingdom
Yad La-Shiryon – Latrun, Israel
Parola Tank Museum – Finland
Military museum Lešany – Czech Republic
German Tank Museum – Germany
Military Museum, Belgrade – Serbia
Ontario Regiment Museum – Oshawa, Ontario
Canadian War Museum – Ottawa, Ontario
Base Borden Military Museum - Canada
Dutch Cavalry Museum - Amersfoort, The Netherlands
Nationaal Militair Museum – Soesterberg, The Netherlands
Royal Tank Museum – Jordan
American Heritage Museum – United States
Försvarsfordonsmuseet Arsenalen - Sweden
Cavalry Tank Museum, Ahmednagar - India

References

External links 

 Tank museum, old website
 Official new museum website

Museums established in 1978
Military and war museums in Russia
Tank museums
Museums in Moscow Oblast
World War II museums in Russia
1978 establishments in the Soviet Union
Kubinka